Sycon ciliatum is a species of calcareous sponge belonging to the family Sycettidae.

Description
This small purse sponge grows singly or in small groups from a single holdfast. It is up to five centimetres long, fairly stiff, greyish-white and spindle-shaped. The osculum at the tip is fringed with fine spicules. The surface of the sponge appears furry from its covering of fine papillae. The skeleton consists of a tangential layer of triactines and another of tetractines. This species can be distinguished from the rather similar Sycon raphanus by the fact that the choanocyte chambers are not fused but are free from each other.

Distribution and habitat
Sycon ciliatum is common along the coasts of Europe and occurs on the eastern fringes of the Atlantic Ocean from Scandinavia south to Portugal. It is found low down on the shore and in the neritic zone, amongst seaweed, under stones or in rock pools in areas without strong wave action.

References

Leucosolenida
Animals described in 1780